Agyneta orites is a species of sheet weaver found in Central Europe. It was described by Thorell in 1875.

References

orites
Spiders of Europe
Spiders described in 1875